Cole McKinnon (born 29 January 2003) is a Scottish footballer who plays for Partick Thistle, on loan from Rangers, as a midfielder.

Career
McKinnon, a product of the Rangers Academy, signed a contract extension with Rangers until 2022, on 29 September 2020. On 12 March 2021, he joined then Scottish League One side East Fife on loan for the rest of the season. He made nine league appearances for the Fifers, his first being a late substitute appearance in a 3–1 win away to Clyde on 20 March 2021.

McKinnon made his debut for Rangers by replacing Aaron Ramsey as a 60th minute substitute during a 3–1 win over Heart of Midlothian on 14 May 2022, and scored the final goal.

References

External links
 

2003 births
Living people
Scottish footballers
Association football midfielders
Rangers F.C. players
East Fife F.C. players
Scottish Professional Football League players
Lowland Football League players
Partick Thistle F.C. players